Season 1987–88 was the 104th football season in which Dumbarton competed at a Scottish national level, entering the Scottish Football League for the 82nd time, the Scottish Cup for the 93rd time and the Scottish League Cup for the 41st time.

Overview 
Following two promotion challenging seasons, Dumbarton inexplicably sank to the bottom of the First Division and were relegated to the third tier of Scottish league football.  With the loss of Sir Hugh Fraser, finances at the club were tight, and with this in mind it was decided to appoint Mark Clougherty as player/manager.  However results were generally poor and the board sacked Clougherty in January.  In his place Bertie Auld was appointed and despite a spirited draw against Hibernian in the Cup, a winless run of 11 games would ensure the club's drop into bottom place in the league - a place they would occupy even though Dumbarton were unbeaten in their last four games.

In the Scottish Cup, another third round exit was Dumbarton's fate, although this would be after a draw against Premier Division opponents Hibernian.

In the League Cup, for the second year in a row Celtic were Dumbarton's third round opponents, and it would be the Premier Division side that would ease through to the next round.

Locally however, Dumbarton regained the Stirlingshire Cup, with a final victory over Stirling Albion.

Results & fixtures

Scottish First Division

Skol Cup

Scottish Cup

Stirlingshire Cup

Pre-season matches

League table

Player statistics

Squad 

|}

Transfers

Players in

Players out

Reserve team
Dumbarton competed in the Scottish Reserve League (West), winning 11 and drawing 11 of 33 games.

Trivia
 The League match against Clydebank on 29 August marked Owen Coyle's 100th appearance for Dumbarton in all national competitions - the 93rd Dumbarton player to reach this milestone.
 The League match against Forfar Athletic on 12 September marked Donald McNeil's 300th appearance for Dumbarton in all national competitions - the 6th Dumbarton player to achieve this accolade.
 The League match against Forfar Athletic on 12 September also marked Steve McCahill's 100th appearance for Dumbarton in all national competitions - the 94th Dumbarton player to reach this milestone.
 The League match against Queen of the South on 26 September marked Pat McGowan's 200th appearance for Dumbarton in all national competitions - the 20th Dumbarton player to break the 'double century'.
 The League match against East Fife on 14 November marked Alan Kay's 100th appearance for Dumbarton in all national competitions - the 95th Dumbarton player to reach this milestone.
 The League match against Raith Rovers on 13 February marked Gerry McCoy's 100th appearance for Dumbarton in all national competitions - the 96th Dumbarton player to reach this milestone.

See also
 1987–88 in Scottish football

References

External links
Jim McNeil (Dumbarton Football Club Historical Archive)
Jimmy Bell (Dumbarton Football Club Historical Archive)
Benny Rooney (Dumbarton Football Club Historical Archive)
Scottish Football Historical Archive

Dumbarton F.C. seasons
Scottish football clubs 1987–88 season